Purushottam Das (Born: 7 July 1907 – Died: 21 January 1991) was the pioneer of the Nathdwara school of Pakhawaj (a barrel-shaped, two-headed drum instrument usually played in the Indian subcontinent) playing.

Awards and recognitions
 Rajasthan Sangeet Natak Academi Award, Jodhpure in 1971
 Sahitya kala Parishad (Literary Art Council), New delhi in 1978
 Taal-Vilas by Sur Singar Samsad, Mumbai in 1978
 President's Award by Sangeet Natak Academy, New delhi in 1978
 Dagar Gharana Award by Maharana Mewar Foundation, Udaipur in 1982
 Kalani Award by Kalani organization, Jodhpur in 1983
 Padma Shri in 1984
 Traavankor Maharaj Swati Tirullu Dhrupad Award by Sire of Banaras in 1985
 Nana Panse Award by Dhrupad Organization, Indor in 1985
 Fellowship Award by Rajasthan Sangeet Natak Academy, Jodhpur in 1989
He was the son of Sri Ghanshyam Das ji and the eldest member of Nathdwara parampara. Since he was five years old he was able to recite and play various  in traditional ways. Sri Ghanshyam Das ji used to take little Purushottam along to the temple while playing for the Lord. When he was just nine, his father died and Purushottam was burdened to carry the parampara. He successfully managed to carry it on his shoulders. And served at Sri Nathdwara Temple following his ancestors for many years. Later he joined Bhartiya Kala Kendra and Kathak Kendra at Delhi and finally came back to Sri Nathdwara and left his body there. He had no son but he trained and developed many good disciples including Sri Prakash Chandra, Sri Shyamlal and Sri Ramkrishna (Nathdwara), Sri Durgalal, Maharaj Chhatrapati Singh, Sri Harikrishna Bahera, Pt Totaram Shrama etc.(by Ananya Sharma from St Kabeer Academy, Dehradun)

References

External links
 kathakensemble.com - Purushottam Das
 The Tribune - An interview: "An artiste must keep trying to change the world"

1907 births
Year of death missing
Indian male musicians
Rajasthani people
People from Rajsamand district
Recipients of the Padma Shri in arts
Recipients of the Sangeet Natak Akademi Award